Vargula is a genus in the Cypridinidae. The genus contains bioluminescent species. Vargula hilgendorfii (formerly Cypridina hilgendorfii), native to Japan, is likely the best-studied Vargula species. Some species currently within Vargula (e.g. Vargula tsujii) may be split into their own genus.

References

Ostracod genera
Bioluminescent ostracods